Nekrasovo is a rural locality (a village) in Chaykovsky, Perm Krai, Russia. The population was 13 as of 2010. There is 1 street.

Geography 
Nekrasovo is located 34 km southeast of Chaykovsky. Zipunovo is the nearest rural locality.

References 

Rural localities in Chaykovsky urban okrug